Western College may refer to:

Western College for Women, Oxford, Ohio, US
Western College of Veterinary Medicine, Saskatoon, Saskatchewan, Canada
Western College (Iowa), US
Western College, Bristol, England
Western College, Stephenville, Newfoundland, Canada